Gulak may refer to:
 23722 Gulak, an asteroid
 Drew Gulak, an American professional wrestler
 Gulak, Khusf County, a village in Iran